Alice Martha Bacon, Baroness Bacon,  (10 September 1909 – 24 March 1993) was a British Labour Party politician born in Normanton, West Yorkshire.

Early life and education 
Bacon's father was secretary of the Whitwood branch of the National Union of Mineworkers and the family joined in local campaigns to alleviate poverty. She was educated at Normanton Girls' High School and Stockwell Teachers' Training College, before becoming a schoolteacher.

Political career
Bacon delivered her first political speech at the age of 16, when she also joined the Labour Party. In 1935, she became as Labour's League of Youth delegate to the Socialist Youth International Conference. Bacon was active in the National Union of Teachers and became president of its West Yorkshire division in 1944.

In 1938, Bacon was selected as the candidate for Leeds North East, for which she became the MP in the 1945 general election, as the city's first woman MP. When constituency boundaries were revised for the 1955 general election, she transferred to Leeds South East constituency and served it as MP until she retired in 1970. 

Bacon was on the Labour Party's National Executive Committee from 1941 until 1970, and chaired it in 1950–1951. In the 1953 Coronation Honours she was appointed a CBE.

When Labour returned to government in 1964, Bacon became a Minister of State at the Home Office up to 1967, serving under Frank Soskice and Roy Jenkins in a period of liberalising reforms. She was appointed to the Privy Council in 1966. From 1967 to 1970 she was Minister of State at the Department of Education and Science, where she campaigned for comprehensive education.

On her retirement from the House of Commons, Bacon was created on 14 October 1970 Baroness Bacon of the City of Leeds and of Normanton in the West Riding of Yorkshire.

Memorial
A Leeds Civic Trust Blue Plaque was unveiled by Rachel Reeves in 2019 in Leeds Corn Exchange.

References

Alice Bacon  at the Centre for Advancement of Women in Politics

External links



1909 births
1993 deaths
20th-century British women politicians
Chairs of the Labour Party (UK)
Commanders of the Order of the British Empire
Life peeresses created by Elizabeth II
Female members of the Parliament of the United Kingdom for English constituencies
Labour Party (UK) MPs for English constituencies
Labour Party (UK) life peers
Leeds Blue Plaques
Members of the Privy Council of the United Kingdom
Ministers in the Wilson governments, 1964–1970
Politicians from Normanton, West Yorkshire
UK MPs 1945–1950
UK MPs 1950–1951
UK MPs 1951–1955
UK MPs 1955–1959
UK MPs 1959–1964
UK MPs 1964–1966
UK MPs 1966–1970
UK MPs who were granted peerages
Labour Party (UK) councillors
20th-century English women
20th-century English people
Women councillors in England